Robert Steven Kaplan (born 1957) was most recently the president and CEO of the Federal Reserve Bank of Dallas and is a former long-time Goldman Sachs executive.

Prior to joining the Dallas Fed, Kaplan was a faculty member and senior associate dean at the Harvard Business School.

Kaplan is an active venture philanthropist through his work as co-chairman of the Draper Richards Kaplan Foundation. He serves as chairman of Project ALS, and was a board member of Harvard Medical School until 2017.

He is the author of three books on business leadership.

Career
Kaplan was vice chairman of the Goldman Sachs Group, Inc. with global responsibility for the firm's Investment Banking and Investment Management Divisions. He became a partner in 1990 and served as co-chairman of the firm's Partnership Committee. He was also a member of the Management Committee.

Following his 23-year career at Goldman Sachs, Kaplan became a senior director of the firm.

In 2006, Kaplan joined the faculty of the Harvard Business School, as a Senior Associate Dean and the Martin Marshall Professor of Management Practice.

In August 2015, Kaplan was named to head the Federal Reserve Bank of Dallas, effective September 2015.
In early September 2021, a financial disclosure form showed that Kaplan conducted controversible million-dollar trades of S&P index futures and less controversible trades of individual stocks, including Apple, Amazon and Delta Airlines and owned 32 individual stocks with 27 having a value of over $1 million, including those of five fossil-fuel companies. Kaplan's trading activities, particularly of S&P index futures, received widespread criticism for undermining confidence in the Federal Reserve. All transactions occurred outside of the Federal Reserve's financial blackout period and were approved by the bank's compliance department. Sen. Elizabeth Warren has called on all Federal Reserve presidents to have a ban on the trading and ownership of individual stocks by regional senior officials. Due to the ethics concerns, Kaplan said he would sell his individual stocks.

On September 27, 2021, Kaplan announced he would be retiring early from his position as the president of the Federal Reserve Bank of Dallas, citing distractions (insider trading) over his stock market trades. His retirement took effect on October 8, 2021.

Personal life and education
Kaplan was born and raised in Prairie Village, Kansas, and is a graduate of the University of Kansas in 1979 and Harvard Business School in 1983. He lives with his two sons in Dallas, Texas.

Bibliography
Books
 Kaplan, Robert Steven. What You Really Need to Lead: The Power of Thinking and Acting Like an Owner. Boston, MA, USA: Harvard Business Review Press, September 2015.
 Kaplan, Robert Steven. What You're Really Meant To Do: A Road Map for Reaching Your Unique Potential. Boston, MA, USA: Harvard Business Review Press, 2013. 
 Kaplan, Robert Steven. What to Ask the Person in the Mirror: Critical Questions for Becoming a More Effective Leader and Reaching Your Potential. Boston: Harvard Business Review Press, 2011.

Journal articles
 Neeley, Tsedal, and Robert Steven Kaplan. "What's Your Language Strategy? It Should Bind Your Company's Global Talent Management and Vision." R1409D. Harvard Business Review 92, no. 9 (September 2014): 70–76.
 Kaplan, Robert Steven. "Top Executives Need Feedback: Here's How They Can Get It." McKinsey Quarterly, no. 4 (2011): 60–71.
 Kaplan, Robert Steven. "Reaching Your Potential." HBS Centennial Issue Harvard Business Review 86, nos. 7/8 (July–August 2008): 45–49.
 Kaplan, Robert Steven. "What to Ask the Person in the Mirror." Harvard Business Review 85, no. 1 (January 2007).

References

1957 births
20th-century American Jews
21st-century American Jews
Federal Reserve Bank of Dallas presidents
Goldman Sachs people
Harvard Business School alumni
Harvard Business School faculty
Living people
People from Prairie Village, Kansas
University of Kansas alumni